Hilsman is a surname. Notable people with the surname include:

Hoyt Hilsman, American author, journalist, and political figure
Roger_Hilsman (1919–2014), American soldier, government official, political scientist, and author
William Hilsman (politician) (1900–1964), American politician
William J. Hilsman